Rehal Dhamalian is situated in Bishnah tehsil and located in Jammu district of Jammu and Kashmir, India. It is one of 116 villages in Bishnah block along with villages like Nandrol and Rehal Kalandrian.

References

External links
The Rehal Dhamalian

Villages in Jammu district